Fire, Fusion & Steel is a supplement about vehicle construction published by Game Designers' Workshop (GDW) in 1993 for the science fiction role-playing game Traveller .

Description
Fire, Fusion & Steel is a 112-page softcover book designed by David Golden and Guy Garnett, with illustrations by Steve Bryant and Bryan Gibson, and cover art by Chris Foss. The focus of the book is designing various vehicles, both ground vehicles and space ships, in accordance with both the laws of physics and the rules of Traveller. Various formulae for calculating parameters are included, as well as 225 tables of reference numbers. 

For example, to calculate a rocket's thrust in newtons, the player is directed to add the rocket's mass in kilograms to the square root of the rocket's designed velocity in kilometres per hour, then divide the sum by a modifier taken from Table 119.   

In his 2014 book Designers & Dragons, Shannon Appelcline commented that "1997's [Traveller] supplements [by GDW] included a few more equipment books and Fire, Fusion & Steel, an extensive vehicle creation system; together these were just the sort of thing you'd expect to find in a Traveller line."

Reception
In the January 1998 edition of Dragon (Issue #243), Rick Swan acknowledged that Traveller had always been fuelled by "hard science", but even so, he confessed "to being baffled by Fire, Fusion & Steel, a supplement so dense with numbers that it might as well be written in Chinese... it more closely resembles a physics text for precocious grad students." Swan concluded by giving the book an average rating of 3 stars out of 6, saying "For those of us who still count on our fingers, Fire, Fusion & Steel is about as appealing as a rat in our lunch box."

Reviews
White Wolf #47 (Sept., 1994)

References

Role-playing game supplements introduced in 1993
Traveller (role-playing game) supplements